Pararena is an action computer game for the Apple Macintosh computer originally written in 1990 by John Calhoun and released as shareware. Calhoun previously wrote the Macintosh game Glider.

In 1992, in association with Casady & Greene, Calhoun wrote version 2.0 of Pararena which had 16 color graphics and was then a commercial product.

Gameplay 
It is a mouse-controlled ball game where two players compete on hoverboards in a parabolic arena with two "goals" on the sides. The objective is to gain scores by getting the ball into the other player's goal and, on the other hand, to protect one's own goal. The ball can be held for a while by squatting on it (holding the mouse button down) and then thrown to the current direction. If a player is tossed out of the arena still holding the ball, the player is charged with a foul and will respawn in a few seconds.  Similarly, if the player throws the ball out of the arena, the player is charged with a foul and the ball will respawn.  Each time a player amasses five fouls, the opponent is awarded with a point.

The game is situated in space and the two competing teams are called "Earth" and "Taygete".

Reception 
Pararena was reviewed by Matthew Wilber who described the game as "one of the great hits that never was" praising "clean graphics, memorable characters" and "elegantly simple game play".

Legacy 
On 27 Jan 2016, the source code, graphics, and sound data for Pararena were released on GitHub with the source code being licensed under the MIT license.

References

External links 
 The Vintage Mac Museum: Pararena Slideshows
 Pararena download at the Macintosh Garden
 

1990 video games
Classic Mac OS-only games
Classic Mac OS games
Commercial video games with freely available source code
Free software
Software using the MIT license
Video games developed in the United States